Skopinsky Uyezd (Скопинский уезд) was one of the subdivisions of the Ryazan Governorate of the Russian Empire. It was situated in the southwestern part of the governorate. Its administrative centre was Skopin.

Demographics
At the time of the Russian Empire Census of 1897, Skopinsky Uyezd had a population of 176,682. Of these, 99.4% spoke Russian, 0.2% Polish, 0.2% Ukrainian and 0.1% Yiddish as their native language.

References

 
Uezds of Ryazan Governorate
Ryazan Governorate